Kate Haber ( Sauks, born August 31, 1984) is a Canadian national rower. She won bronze at the 2016 World Rowing Championships in Rotterdam while competing in the lightweight women's sculls. Haber is the reigning two-time Pan American Games Champion when she won gold in lightweight women's double sculls with gold with Liz Fenje at the 2015 Pan American Games in Toronto, and Jaclyn Stelmaszyk at the 2019 Pan Am Games in Lima. She started rowing at the University of Toronto after injuries from her track and field days in the pole vault and pentathlon events forced her to move to a new sport. Haber has her PhD in Rehabilitation Sciences and Anatomy from the University of Toronto.

References 

1984 births
Living people
Canadian female rowers
Pan American Games gold medalists for Canada
Rowers at the 2015 Pan American Games
Rowers at the 2019 Pan American Games
Rowers from Toronto
Rowers from Victoria, British Columbia
Pan American Games medalists in rowing
World Rowing Championships medalists for Canada
Medalists at the 2015 Pan American Games
Medalists at the 2019 Pan American Games
21st-century Canadian women